The 1998 Michigan gubernatorial election was held on November 3, 1998, to elect the Governor and Lieutenant Governor of the state of Michigan. Incumbent Governor John Engler, a member of the Republican Party, was re-elected over Democratic Party nominee Geoffrey Fieger, a lawyer who had represented the assisted suicide advocate Jack Kevorkian. , this was the last time Genesee County and Washtenaw County voted for the Republican gubernatorial candidate.

Republican primary

Candidates
 Gary Artinian
 John Engler, incumbent governor

Engler, a two-term incumbent, faced token opposition in the Republican primary, winning re-nomination with 90 percent of the vote. Following Lt. Gov. Connie Binsfeld's decision to not seek a third term, State Senate Majority Leader Dick Posthumus received the GOP nomination for lieutenant governor.

Results

Democratic primary

Candidates
 Geoffrey Fieger, Attorney
 Larry Owen, former Mayor of East Lansing
 Doug Ross

Early in the race, Owen was considered the front runner. But due to Fieger's notoriety and personal wealth, he surpassed his opponents. He ended spending almost $6 million of his own money in the race. Fieger won a close race, taking 41 percent of the vote. State Rep. Jim Agee, after securing the support from the Michigan Education Association was picked by Fieger to be his running mate, over Fieger's initial preferred choice state Rep. Candace Curtis.

Results

Results

Results by county

References

1998
Governor
Michigan